Oretown is an unincorporated community in Tillamook County, Oregon, United States.

In 1877, settlers James B. Upton and S. H. Rock petitioned Senator John H. Mitchell asking for a mail route to Grand Ronde and a post office. Upton owned a seal marked "Oregon City", so he suggested the new post office be named "Ore City" and he would alter the seal so it could be used for the new community. Mitchell knew confusion with Oregon City would occur, and suggested the name "Oretown" to the postal authorities instead. The name was accepted and Oretown post office ran from 1877 to 1954. Today Oretown has a Cloverdale mailing address.

At one time Oretown had a cheese factory and a salmon cannery. Today the community has a historic church, the 1913 Oretown Bible Church, a Grange hall built in 1907, and a few houses.

References

External links
Images of Oretown from Flickr
Biography of James Boughton Upton

History of Oretown Grange
History of churches in Oretown
History and images of Oretown School

Unincorporated communities in Tillamook County, Oregon
1877 establishments in Oregon
Populated places established in 1877
Unincorporated communities in Oregon